The ASW 22 is an Open Class glider built by Alexander Schleicher GmbH & Co which first flew in 1981. The 'W' in the designation indicates that this is a product of the German designer Gerhard Waibel. An ASW 22 broke the world 750 km triangle speed record in 1985 and ASW 22s have won first place in six World Gliding Championships.

Design
The ASW 22 is the successor to the ASW 17. It first flew as a 22-metre glider. The span was later increased to 25 metres for the ASW 22B with a modified inner wing section and flaperons similar to the ASW 20. It uses a Horstmann and Quast wing profile on the inner section with underwing tubes to collect high-pressure air which is then expelled through turbulator holes in the bottom wing skin ahead of the flap and aileron hinge line to prevent the separation of the laminar flow. The ASW 22 has a two-wheel retractable undercarriage.

Variants

ASW 22Open Class high-performance sailplane; 22 or 24 metre span
ASW 22MFirst motorized self-launching version with 22/24 m span, Rotax 505A engine
AS 22-2The prototype of the ASH 25, which combined the wing of the ASW 22 with a two-seat fuselage
ASW 22BSpan increased to 25 m
ASW 22BLFitted with 26.4 m tips
ASW 22BE, BLE self-launching versions with 49 hp Rotax 505A engine
ASW 22BLE 50Rself-launching version with 50 hp rotary engine
ASW 22DB ETA biter A response to the Eta, from Gerhard Waibel and Dick Butler, derived from the ASW 22BL.

Specifications (ASW 22BL)

See also

References

Further reading

External links

Schleicher website
Photograph
Sailplane Directory

1980s German sailplanes
Schleicher aircraft
T-tail aircraft
Aircraft first flown in 1981
Shoulder-wing aircraft